La Malinche National Park is located in the states of Puebla and Tlaxcala in Central Mexico.

It was declared a national park on October 6, 1938, with a protected area of 45,711 hectares. Most of this area is covered by coniferous forests, which are home to more than 100 species of mammals, birds and reptiles, 16 of which are endemic to the Neovolcanic Axis, 6 species of pines and 120 species of plants.

Volcano
The La Malinche—Matlalcueitl volcano, part of the Trans-Mexican Volcanic Belt, is within the park. It is frequently used by mountaineers for training and altitude acclimatization before climbing the higher volcanos in the region.

The volcano's slope is gentle, and its vicinity to Mexico City makes it a popular weekend destination. A paved road reaches the top of the volcano. The "Centro Vacacional IMSS La Malintzi" on the volcano has 40 cabins, a camping area and some recreational facilities.

See also
List of national parks of Mexico
List of volcanoes in Mexico

References

External links

National parks of Mexico
Protected areas of Puebla
Protected areas of Tlaxcala
Protected areas of the Trans-Mexican Volcanic Belt
Important Bird Areas of Mexico